The Unleash Award was the annual award for the best Dutch fantasy/science-fiction and horror/suspense short story with a wordcount between 2,000 and 6,000 words.

Other annual Dutch awards in the SF/F/H genres are the Harland Award (for short stories and novelettes with a word count up to 10,000 words) and Fantastels (for short stories and novelettes with a word count up to 12,000 words).

History
The forerunner of the Unleash Award was the Santoriaanse opdracht, since 2003. In 2006 the name changed to Unleash Award. The prize was initially awarded in two separate categories and twice a year (with overall winners). Since 2009 it is awarded once a year. The last time the Unleash Award was organized was in 2012.

Winners

References
home.planet.nl
schrijverspunt.nl

Science fiction awards
Dutch literary awards
Awards established in 2006
Short story awards